The 40 Greatest Players in Philippine Basketball Association History is a set of players chosen in 2000 and 2015 to commemorate the founding of the Philippine Basketball Association.

In 2015, 15 players were added to the list to commemorate the league's 40th anniversary. The awarding was held at the Resorts World Manila on April 8, 2015. The award was rechristened as FAB @ 40 (40th Greatest Players).

Criteria
The following criteria were used by a committee in selecting players for the first 25 players in the list:
The player must have played at least four (4) full seasons with the league.
The player must be a recipient of a major award (either an MVP or Rookie of the Year awardee or a member of the mythical selection, or all-defensive teams)
The player must have done a major impact with the sport and the league.
The player must have contributed towards the positive development of basketball in the country.

Criticism on the 15 additional players
The additional 15 players that was added in 2015 caused controversy because some were still young and active (Williams-33, Pingris-34) and still at the peak of their career. Though the selection is valid, some from the 25 original cast questioned why some of the retired PBA legends were not included in the list like Nelson Asaytono, Abe King, Yoyoy Villamin, Olsen Racela, and Jeffrey Cariaso. Many says that such players like Kerby Raymundo, Marlou Aquino and Marc Pingris should have not been included on the list. There were also the usual controversial picks such as Chito Loyzaga who played for popular teams like Ginebra San Miguel and were selected over some of the aforementioned players. This is despite the fact that Loyzaga was only a one time member of the Mythical Second team and played a supporting role to stars such as Robert Jaworski during his tenure with the team. Loyzaga himself was quoted to have suspected that he was being pranked when he heard the news of his selection.

Players selected in 2000

Players selected in 2015

Grandslam coaches

Before handing out the awards for the 25 PBA greatest players, the four Grand Slam head coaches up to 2000 were also recognized.

See also
 Philippine Basketball Association Most Valuable Player award
 Philippine Basketball Association Best Player of the Conference Award
 PBA Hall of Fame

References

External links
 The 25 all-time greatest players at PBA.ph

25
PBA